Ramón González Peña (1888 – 27 July 1952) was an Asturian socialist and trade union leader. González was a prominent leader in the 1934 miners revolt in Asturias, under which he led the Oviedo Revolutionary Committee. After the revolt, he was sentenced to death. One year later, however, he was reprieved. González served as the president of Unión General de Trabajadores, in which he was in conflict with Largo Caballero. He was also a Member of Parliament and was the Minister of Justice 1938–1939. After the Spanish Civil War González Peña went to exile in Mexico, where he died on 27 July 1952.

References

1888 births
1952 deaths
People from Oviedo (Asturian comarca)
Spanish Socialist Workers' Party politicians
Justice ministers of Spain
Members of the Congress of Deputies of the Second Spanish Republic
Politicians from Asturias
Unión General de Trabajadores members
Spanish prisoners sentenced to death
Prisoners sentenced to death by Spain
Spanish people of the Spanish Civil War (Republican faction)
Exiles of the Spanish Civil War in Mexico
Exiled Spanish politicians